Libeliče (in older sources also Ljibeliče, German: Leifling) is a village in the Municipality of Dravograd in the Carinthia region in northern Slovenia, right on the border with Austria.

The parish church in the settlement is dedicated to Saint Martin and belongs to the Roman Catholic Archdiocese of Maribor. It was first mentioned in written documents dating to 1106, but the current building was built in the second half of the 18th century. Next to the church is a 12th-century two-story ossuary.

References

External links
Libeliče on Geopedia
Homepage of Libeliče (in Slovene)
Parish of Libeliče (in Slovene)

Populated places in the Municipality of Dravograd